Ferdinando "Fred" Buscaglione (23 November 1921 – 3 February 1960) was an Italian singer and actor who became very popular in the late 1950s. His public persona – the character he played both in his songs and his movies – was of a humorous mobster with a penchant for whisky and women.

Biography
Ferdinando Buscaglione was born in Turin, Italy on 23 November 1921. The father was a painter and the mother a porter and piano teacher, both coming from Graglia, his great passion for music appeared at a very young age. When he was 11, his parents enrolled him at the Giuseppe Verdi Conservatory in Turin. During his teen years, he performed at night clubs in Turin singing jazz and playing double bass and violin.

During World War II, he was incarcerated in an American internment camp in Sardinia.  His musical talent was apparent and he was allowed to join the orchestra of the allied radio station of Cagliari. This permitted Buscaglione to continue to make music and to experiment with new sounds and rhythms coming from the U.S.  (Most foreign music had been officially forbidden by the Italian Fascist regime.)

After the war, Buscaglione returned to Turin and went to live in Via Eusebio Bava 26 bis and resumed working as a musician for various bands. He then formed his own group, the Asternovas. During a tour in Switzerland in 1949 he met and married the half-German half-Moroccan entertainer Fatima Robin. In the meantime he was gradually creating his public character, inspired by Clark Gable and Mickey Spillane's gangsters. His friend Leo Chiosso was a lyricist who wrote many of his songs. Together they wrote the hits that brought nationwide fame to Buscaglione: Che bambola (Whatta babe!), Teresa non sparare (Theresa, don't shoot!), Eri piccola così (You were small like that), Guarda che luna (Look, What A (beautiful) Moon), Love in Portofino, Porfirio Villarosa (a caricature of Porfirio Rubirosa), Whisky facile (Easy Whiskey).

After perfecting his routine in night clubs and theatres he started recording his songs in 1955; the first single (a shellac 78rpm record containing 'Che bambola' and 'Giacomino') sold 1,000,000 copies with close to no promotion, propelling him to a degree of fame he never considered possible.

By the end of the 1950s, Buscaglione was one of Italy's most wanted entertainers. He appeared on advertising campaigns, on television, in movies.

At 38 years of age, he was killed in a car accident when his lilac Ford Thunderbird collided with a truck Lancia Esatau in the early hours before dawn in Rome. Immediately brought to the hospital in a bus flagged down by the truck driver, he arrived there too late. Only hours earlier he had dinner with some friends at a restaurant in Rome and met future Italian pop diva Mina Mazzini who made her Sanremo Music Festival debut earlier. The two discussed future collaboration that sadly never materialized. Tens of thousands people attended his funeral in Turin on 6 February 1960. He is buried in the Cimitero Monumentale.

Alongside his legacy, in songs and movies, Buscaglione deserves mention for having encouraged musicians and singers from the newer generation (the one influenced by the earliest forms of rock and roll) to stand up against the conservative producers and discographers of the time, demanding recognition for their art and their style. In this role he proved instrumental in the rise of the "yellers" scene which from the early 60s started to revolutionize the Italian popular music panorama.

Selected filmography
 Tough Guys (1960)

References

External links 
 

1921 births
1960 deaths
Italian jazz singers
Actors from Turin
Road incident deaths in Italy
20th-century Italian male actors
20th-century Italian male singers
Male jazz musicians
Musicians from Turin
Italian military personnel of World War II
Italian prisoners of war in World War II
World War II prisoners of war held by the United States